Franciszek Jarecki (born September 7, 1931 – died October 24, 2010) was a pilot in the Polish Air Force, who became famous in early 1953 when he escaped Soviet-controlled Poland in a Mikoyan-Gurevich MiG-15 jet, one of the best Soviet planes at that time.

Early life
Jarecki was born in 1931 in Gdów, a town near Kraków. His family soon moved to Stanisławów, where his father died in 1939, and in 1945 was deported by the Soviets to Bytom, Upper Silesia. He was a graduate of a prestigious Polish Air Force Academy in Dęblin. Some time in the early 1950s, he was moved to Słupsk in northern Poland, near the Baltic Sea. There he flew MiG-15s as a few of them were operated by the Polish Air Force.

Defection

On the morning of March 5, 1953 (coincidentally, the day of Joseph Stalin's death), Jarecki escaped Poland in a MiG-15. The decision was a very risky one, as the People's Army of Poland had previously shot those who tried to escape. For example, Edward Pytko, an instructor at Dęblin, tried to escape to West Germany in 1952, but was stopped by Soviet aircraft over East Germany and handed back to the Poles; Pytko was charged with high treason and executed. 
Jarecki flew from Słupsk to the field airport at Rønne on the Danish island of Bornholm, where Jarecki landed, wheels intact. The whole trip took him only a few minutes. There, specialists from the United States, called by Danish authorities, thoroughly checked the plane. According to international regulations, they returned it by ship to Poland a few weeks later.

Jarecki remained in the West. From Denmark, he moved to London, where General Władysław Anders awarded him the Cross of Merit, and then to the United States, where he provided crucial information about modern Soviet aircraft and air tactics. Among those who shook his hand was President Dwight D. Eisenhower. Jarecki received a $50,000 prize for the person who was first to present a MiG-15 to the Americans and became a U.S. citizen.

A few months later, another Polish pilot, Zdzisław Jażwinski, escaped with a MiG-15 to Bornholm. Three years later, four students of Dęblin's school escaped in two Yakovlev Yak-18 planes, crossing Czechoslovakia to land near Vienna in neutral Austria. The leaflets used in Operation Moolah during the Korean War carried a photo of Jarecki.

Later life
After some time in London, England, Jarecki moved to the United States, living in Pennsylvania until his death on October 24, 2010. He achieved a college degree at Alliance College, and went into business, owning a factory in Fairview, Pennsylvania, called Jarecki Valves, and Commodore Downs, a local horse racing track. The uniform in which he escaped can be seen at the National Air and Space Museum in Washington, D.C. In 2006, Polish TV Station TVN made a film, Jarecki, which is part of the "Great Escapes" series. The series shows stories about Poles who escaped the country between 1944–1989 and chose freedom in the West.

See also
 List of Cold War pilot defections
 List of Eastern Bloc defectors

References

External links

 https://web.archive.org/web/20071116210930/http://www.military-heat.com/46/black-ops-american-pilots-flying-russian-aircraft-cold-war/

1931 births
2010 deaths
People from Wieliczka County
Polish aviators
Polish emigrants to the United States
Polish defectors
Defectors to the United States
Polish Air Force officers
Polish People's Army personnel